Katya Jones (born Ekaterina Andreevna Sokolova; ; 12 May 1989) is a Russian dancer and choreographer. She is best-known for being a professional dancer in the competition show Strictly Come Dancing, which she won in 2017 with her dance partner Joe McFadden. In the 2020 series, Jones was paired with the retired professional and Olympic champion boxer Nicola Adams, the first same-sex couple to compete in the UK competition's format.

Early life
She was born in Sestroretsk, near Leningrad, Soviet Union, and started dancing at the age of six, training in gymnastics as well as Ballroom and Latin-American dancing. Her father is a senior oil company executive and her Korean mother is a graduate in engineering.

Strictly Come Dancing
In 2016, Jones became a professional in the BBC ballroom dancing show Strictly Come Dancing for its 14th series. Jones was partnered with the former Shadow chancellor, Ed Balls. For the 15th series, Jones partnered the Holby City actor, Joe McFadden. and they were the series winners. For the 16th series, Jones partnered the comedian Seann Walsh and for the 17th series, she was partnered with the BBC sports presenter, Mike Bushell. For the 18th series, she was part of the show's first same-sex couple, with the professional boxer Nicola Adams. They withdrew from the competition on 12 November, after Jones tested positive for COVID-19. She was partnered with the Olympic swimmer Adam Peaty for the 19th series. For its (series 20) she was partnered with former England footballer and manager Tony Adams . They withdrew during the week 8 results show due to Tony sustaining a hamstring injury during his original performance therefore withdrew.

Highest and lowest scoring performances per dance

Performances with Ed Balls
She partnered the politician Ed Balls for the 14th series of Strictly Come Dancing.

 number indicates Ed and Katya were at the bottom of the leaderboard.

Performances with Joe McFadden
She partnered the Scottish actor Joe McFadden for the 15th series of Strictly Come Dancing.

 number indicates Joe and Katya were at the top of the leaderboard.

Performances with Seann Walsh
She partnered the comedian and actor Seann Walsh for the 16th series of Strictly Come Dancing.

 number indicates Seann and Katya were at the bottom of the leaderboard.
 Alfonso Ribeiro filled in for Tonioli

Performances with Mike Bushell
She partnered the television presenter Mike Bushell for the 17th series of Strictly Come Dancing.

 number indicates Mike and Katya were at the bottom of the leaderboard.
 Alfonso Ribeiro filled in for Tonioli

Performances with Nicola Adams
She partnered the boxer Nicola Adams for the 18th series of Strictly Come Dancing. They had to leave the competition after week 3 when Jones tested positive for COVID-19.

Performances with Adam Peaty 
From September 2021, Jones was a contestant on the 19th series of Strictly Come Dancing, partnered by the Olympic swimmer Adam Peaty. They reached week 7, coming ninth.

Performances with Tony Adams 

From September 2022, Jones was a contestant on the 20th series of Strictly Come Dancing, partnered by former England men's association football captain Tony Adams. On week 8, they were announced as one of the bottom two couples. However, they did not compete in the dance-off due to Tony sustaining a hamstring injury, subsequently leading him to withdraw from the competition. This meant Jones became the first professional dancer on the show to have a partner who withdrew twice.

 number indicates Tony and Katya were at the bottom of the leaderboard.

Tour 
Jones took part in the national Strictly Come Dancing - The Live Tour in 2017.

In 2021, it was announced she would be appearing with Neil Jones at Donahey's Dancing with The Stars Weekends in 2022.

Other TV appearances 
In 2021, Jones appeared on CBBC's Saturday Mash Up where she was "super slimed", being covered in 20 buckets of gunge after a vote by viewers. In March 2022, she appeared in the show again and was gunged for a second time, in what was described as one of the biggest super slimes ever.

She appeared as a contestant in Celebrity Masterchef in 2022.

Stage performances 
Jones starred in the dance show Somnium: A Dancer's Dream, directed and choreographed by Neil Jones. The show was performed from 20 to 22 June 2019 at Sadler's Wells Theatre. She has also acted in various pantomimes.

Personal life 
Jones married her boyfriend of five years, Neil Jones, a dancer and fellow cast member of Strictly Come Dancing, on 3 August 2013. In October 2018, a video and photographs of Jones kissing her celebrity Strictly partner, Seann Walsh, were published. On 18 August 2019, Jones and her husband announced that they had separated.

References

External links

1989 births
Living people
Russian female dancers
Russian people of Korean descent
Dancers from Saint Petersburg
Strictly Come Dancing winners
Russian activists against the 2022 Russian invasion of Ukraine
People from Sestroretsk
Russian expatriates in England